Aberdeen F.C. competed in Scottish Football League Division One and Scottish Cup in season 1911–12.

Overview
Aberdeen finished in ninth place in Scottish Division One and were knocked out of the Scottish Cup at the third round stage after a replay defeat to Celtic. Dave Main finished as the club's top scorer with 14 goals. In September 1911, Pittodrie Stadium was closed for two weeks after Rangers players were pelted with stones.

Results

Scottish Division One

Final standings

Scottish Cup

Squad

Appearances & Goals

|}

References

Aberdeen F.C. seasons
Aberdeen